Nemoptera coa, sometimes referred to as the Grecian streamertail, is a species of lacewing within the family Nemopteridae, the spoonwing family. N. coa is native to Greece and East Thrace. There have been instances of individuals within Muğla Province within Turkey as well.

Individuals are often found in xeric Mediterranean phrygana as well as grasslands. N. coa individuals display activity during the daytime.

References

External links
 

Neuroptera of Europe
Neuroptera
Insects described in 1758
Taxa named by Carl Linnaeus